Spinal muscular atrophy with lower extremity predominance, sometimes called lower extremity-predominant spinal muscular atrophy, may refer to:

 Spinal muscular atrophy with lower extremity predominance 1
 Spinal muscular atrophy with lower extremity predominance 2A
 Spinal muscular atrophy with lower extremity predominance 2B

See also 

 Spinal muscular atrophies